The Zimbabwe national cricket team toured New Zealand in January and February 1996 and played a two-match Test series against the New Zealand national cricket team followed by three Limited Overs Internationals (LOI). Both Test matches were drawn. New Zealand were captained by Lee Germon and Zimbabwe by Andy Flower. New Zealand won the LOI series 2–1.

Test series summary

First Test

Second Test

One Day Internationals (ODIs)

New Zealand won the series 2-1.

1st ODI

2nd ODI

3rd ODI

References

1996 in New Zealand cricket
1996 in Zimbabwean cricket
International cricket competitions from 1994–95 to 1997
New Zealand cricket seasons from 1970–71 to 1999–2000
1995-96